The Boldest Job in the West (Spanish:El más fabuloso golpe del Far-West) is a 1972 western film directed by José Antonio de la Loma and starring Mark Edwards, Carmen Sevilla and Charly Bravo. The film is a Spaghetti Western, co-produced by France, Italy and Spain. A gang plans to pull off a bank robbery without shedding blood, but their attempt quickly descends into a massacre.

Cast
 Mark Edwards as Michigan  
 Carmen Sevilla as Marion  
 Charly Bravo as Poldo  
 Patty Shepard as Lupe  
 Piero Lulli as Jeremias  
 Barbara Carroll as Sophia  
 Frank Braña as Jess  
 Yvan Verella as Budd  
 Jaume Picas 
 Poldo Bendandi 
 Osvaldo Genazzani 
 Mercedes Linter 
 Fernando Bilbao 
 J. Lintermans  
 Juanito Santiago 
 Fernando Sancho as Reyes 
 Miquel Bordoy

References

Bibliography 
 Thomas Weisser. Spaghetti Westerns--the Good, the Bad and the Violent: A Comprehensive, Illustrated Filmography of 558 Eurowesterns and Their Personnel, 1961-1977. McFarland, 2005.

External links 
 

1972 films
1972 Western (genre) films
Spaghetti Western films
Spanish Western (genre) films
French Western (genre) films
1960s Italian-language films
1960s Spanish-language films
Films directed by José Antonio de la Loma
Films scored by Stelvio Cipriani
1960s Italian films
1970s Italian films